France v United Kingdom [1953] ICJ 3 (also called the Minquiers and Ecrehos Case) was an International Court of Justice case concerning sovereignty over seas.

Facts
The United Kingdom and France requested for the ICJ to determine the country that held sovereignty over the islets and rocks in the Minquiers and Ecrehos groups. France claimed sovereignty because it fished in the waters and it had historic sovereignty over the area from the 11th century's Duchy of Normandy. The United Kingdom claimed that Jersey had historically exercised legal and administrative jurisdiction over them.

Judgment
Initially requested on 5 December 1951, the ICJ decided on 17 November 1953 that sovereignty over the islands belonged to the United Kingdom.

See also
 List of International Court of Justice cases

References
International Court of Justice records of this case

Further reading

External links
William B. Heflin, Diayou/Senkaku Islands Dispute: Japan and China, Oceans Apart, Asian-Pacific Law & Policy Journal, 2000 (including analysis of this case)

International Court of Justice cases
History of Jersey
Disputed islands
1953 in case law
1953 in France
1953 in the United Kingdom
France–United Kingdom relations
1953 in international relations